The Pimlico Oaks was a listed Thoroughbred horse race at Pimlico Race Course in Baltimore, Maryland.  Run at the beginning of April at a distance of 1 1/16 miles on dirt, its purse was $200,000.

Another Pimlico Oaks was raced in 1919 but was changed in 1952 to become the Black-Eyed Susan Stakes.

Winners
1991 - Wide Country
1990 - Stacies Toy
1989 - Open Mind

References
Pimlico Oaks at the Pedigree Query.com
YouTube video - 1989 Pimlico Oaks Open Mind

Horse races in Maryland
Discontinued horse races
1989 establishments in Maryland
1991 disestablishments in Maryland
Recurring sporting events established in 1989
Recurring sporting events disestablished in 1991